Organ Cave is an unincorporated community in Greenbrier County, West Virginia, United States.

As might seem obvious from the name of the town, the principal attraction here is Organ Cave, the ninth longest mapped cave in the United States.  Organ Cave was mined for saltpeter, the principal ingredient of gunpowder, during the Revolutionary War, the War of 1812, and the Civil War.  Confederate General Robert E. Lee and his troops held a church service in the main entrance room of the cave during the war.  Remains of the Civil War mining are in an excellent state of preservation and are seen on the commercial tour.

The early saltpeter miners discovered the bones of a large, unknown animal.  The owner of the cave sent some of the bones (a forearm and a hand with giant claws) to Thomas Jefferson.  Thomas Jefferson described them as "Megalonyx" (Latin for Giant Lion).  This was the first reported find of a giant ground sloth in the United States.  Jefferson soon determined that the animal was actually an extinct sloth, not a lion, but the Genus name "Megalonyx" is retained to this day.  This particular genus is now known as Megalonyx jeffersoni.

References

Humphreys, Blanche (1928), History of Organ Cave Community (Greenbrier County, West Virginia); Agricultural Extension Division.

Unincorporated communities in Greenbrier County, West Virginia
Unincorporated communities in West Virginia